Geliyard (also Romanized as Gelīyard) is a village in Bala Taleqan Rural District, in the Central District of Taleqan County, Alborz Province, Iran. At the 2006 census, its population was 232, in 42 families.  The village is the birthplace of Ayatollah Mahmoud Taleghani.

Etymology
The word Geliyard or Giliyard derives from Gil, which is the name of an ancient ethnicity in Medes united confederation, and were the ancestors af today Gilaks. The -ard also is the suffix of location which means milieu or territory, and derives from the Avestan word of Ard which means land. Hence Geliyard means land of Gil people.

References 

Populated places in Taleqan County